Owers is a surname. Notable people with the surname include:

Adrian Owers (born 1965), English footballer
Anne Owers (born 1947), British prison inspector
Gary Owers (born 1968), English footballer
Ginger Owers (1888–1951), English footballer
Ken Owers (born 1953), English snooker player
Phil Owers (born 1955), English footballer
Mark Owers (born 1973), English government adviser